Acadian House may refer to:

In Canada
Acadian House Museum, West Chezzetcook, Nova Scotia

In the United States
Acadian House (Guilford, Connecticut), listed on the U.S. National Register of Historic Places (NRHP)
Acadian House (St. Martinville, Louisiana), a U.S. National Historic Landmark
Acadia Plantation, former historic home in Thibodaux, Lafourche Parish, Louisiana, demolished in 2010

See also
Acadia Ranch, Oracle, Arizona, listed on the NRHP in Pinal County, Arizona
Acadian Historic Buildings, Van Buren, Maine, listed on the NRHP in Aroostook County, Maine
Acadian Landing Site, Madawaska, Maine, listed on the NRHP in Aroostook County, Maine
Acadian (disambiguation)